Coenodomus rubrescens is a species of snout moth in the genus Coenodomus. It is known from India.

References

Moths described in 1903
Epipaschiinae